Orchard Street United Methodist Church, formerly known as Metropolitan Methodist Episcopal Church, is a historic Methodist Episcopal church located at Baltimore, Maryland, United States. It is a church built in a mixture of revival styles. It was constructed in 1837, with additions made in 1853, 1865, and 1882. The main church is Romanesque Revival, but the rear building is Romanesque with a large Gothic window in its northeastern facade. The church was founded in 1825 by Truman Le Pratt, a West Indian former slave of Governor John Eager Howard. It now houses the offices of the Baltimore Urban League and is the oldest standing structure built by African-Americans in the city of Baltimore.

Orchard Street United Methodist Church was listed on the National Register of Historic Places in 1975.  The church houses an historic 1890 Niemann pipe organ.

Lena King Lee saved the church from demolition during her time in the Maryland House of Delegates.

References

External links

, including undated photo, at Maryland Historical Trust
Baltimore Urban League website
 Orchard Street Church at Explore Baltimore Heritage

Churches in Baltimore
United Methodist churches in Maryland
Properties of religious function on the National Register of Historic Places in Baltimore
African-American history in Baltimore
Churches completed in 1837
19th-century Methodist church buildings in the United States
Seton Hill, Baltimore
Churches on the National Register of Historic Places in Maryland